The FLOSS Manuals (FM) is a non-profit foundation founded in 2006 by Adam Hyde and based in the Netherlands. The foundation is focused on the creation of quality documentation about how to use free software.

Its web site is a wiki (previously using the TWiki and Booki programs, now using Booktype) focused on the collaborative authoring of manuals. The documentation is licensed under the GPL. Although initially the manuals were covered by the GFDL, the material was relicensed to the GPL due to concerns about the limitations of the GFDL.

Anyone can contribute to the material at FLOSS Manuals. Each manual has a maintainer – very much like the Debian maintainer system. The maintainer keeps an overview of the manual and discusses with those interested the structure, etc. The maintainer is also responsible for gathering new contributors together. Not all edits are 'live' – the edits are published to the manual when ready. This is to ensure the quality of the manuals is as high and as reliable as possible and that no new user encounters 'half finished' content.

Manuals are available as HTML online, or indexed PDF. Additionally manuals can be remixed so anyone can create their own manual and export to indexed PDF, HTML (ZIP/tar) or an 'Ajax' include.

In fall 2007, Floss manuals was awarded a 15,000 Euro prize by the Dutch Digital Pioneer fund. It has also been financially supported by Google and NLnet. FLOSS Manuals also received a Transmediale Award for its work on Booki and has also been featured in the Texas Linux Fest 2010.

List of manuals 
FLOSS Manuals has manuals for all of the following.

Popularity
Some manuals have been selected for inclusion on the VALO-CD, a collection of the best software for Windows.

References

External links
 
  (Requires JavaScript)
 Interview: Adam Hyde, FLOSS Manuals
 Adam Hyde: Free Manuals for free software. Talk at Wikimania 2007, Taipei. Abstract 

Free software project foundations
Software documentation